Nacka Municipality (Nacka kommun) is a municipality in Stockholm County in east-central Sweden. Its seat is located at Nacka. The municipality is situated just east of the capital Stockholm and the western parts are considered a suburban part of the city of Stockholm.

The present municipality was created in 1971 when the City of Nacka (itself instituted in 1949) was amalgamated with Saltsjöbaden (itself detached from "old" Nacka in 1909) and Boo.

Geography 
The municipality is situated in two historical provinces (landskap), Uppland and Södermanland, but in one administrative county (län), Stockholm County.

The western densely built-up area of Nacka Municipality is a contiguous part of the city of Stockholm. About 50,000 of the municipality's total population live there.

There are also some more localities in the municipality. The larger ones are: Boo, Fisksätra, Saltsjöbaden, Skuru and Älta.

History 
The area has been populated since the first mountaintops emerged as islands from the sea after the end of the last ice age, during the Mesolithic. During the Viking Age (800 – 1100 AD) the area has been estimated to have been populated by 100 people. They were living by farming and fishing.

A Danish sailing description from the end of the 13th century describes the area as a transportation region. The water roads were easier to use than the land roads and this was also the main road into the capital Stockholm. Due to these circumstances there were plenty of restaurants along the shores to cater to the travelers. An article by Gunnar Ahlberg describes 24 different outlets and their busy service. In the 18th century the restaurants closer to the city were transformed from shabby small places to more sophisticated establishments. Here came not only travelers but also the citizens of Stockholm for a summer excursion. Many of the artists of the times have documented these excursions in drawings as well as songs.

During the wintertime the waterways changes somewhat and instead of taking the sea way the travelers crossed the many lakes with sleighs in order to reach Stockholm.

The municipality's name harks back to a 16th-century industrial operation established by the Crown at Nacka farmstead where conditions for water mills are good. That spot is now, however, not densely populated, and the municipal seat is on land that once belonged to Järla farmstead on the other side of Lake Järla.

One of many battles during the Great Northern War took place in the most eastern part of Nacka. In 1719, Russian forces burned and raided the eastern coast of Sweden. Several cities were attacked and almost all buildings in the archipelago of Stockholm were burned. On their way to Stockholm greatly outnumbered Swedish forces managed to fight off the attacking Russians at the battle of Stäket.

20th century 
The municipality has had a continuous population increase since the 1960s, almost doubling the population. Today it is the third most populous municipality in Stockholm County, after Stockholm Municipality and Huddinge Municipality - and the 20th in Sweden. Due to massive increase in housing supply the population is predicted to grow at an annual rate of more the 3% by the year 2020.

Nacka became the location of an experiment in psychiatry in the 1970s, initiated by psychiatrist Bengt Bengtsson. It allowed the inhabitants a local access to psychotherapeutic methods for preventive purposes. The role model was the Community Mental Health system developed in the U.S. The system has since been implemented in other municipalities.

The industry in Nacka is mainly of service nature. Nacka has an extensive commuting traffic to Stockholm City, and few major companies are located in Nacka itself.

Nature 
Nacka has (in 2015) 12 nature reserves, and two large recreational nature areas, all with a varied landscape of pine forests, swamps and lakes. The largest nature reserve is Nackareservatet with an area of approximately 730 hectare.

Demographics

Population development
Nacka is a municipality whose population has continuously grown over the last 65 years  and had by 2017 passed 100 000 citizens.

Income and Education
The population in Nacka Municipality has the 5th highest median income per capita in Sweden. The share of highly educated persons, according to Statistics Sweden's definition: persons with post-secondary education that is three years or longer, is 39.0% and the 10th highest in the country.

Residents with a foreign background 
On the 31st of December 2017 the number of people with a foreign background (persons born outside of Sweden or with two parents born outside of Sweden) was 25 681, or 25.37% of the population (101 231 on the 31st of December 2017). On the 31st of December 2002 the number of residents with a foreign background was (per the same definition) 16 281, or 21.25% of the population (76 624 on the 31st of December 2002). On 31 December 2017 there were 101 231 residents in Nacka, of which 19 717 people (19.48%) were born in a country other than Sweden. Divided by country in the table below - the Nordic countries as well as the 12 most common countries of birth outside of Sweden for Swedish residents have been included, with other countries of birth bundled together by continent by Statistics Sweden.

Sports
The following sports clubs are located in Nacka:
 Järla IF FK

Points of interests 
Nackasändaren Radio Mast

Notable people 
 Thomas Bodström - lawyer, writer, former politician and Minister for Justice
 Karin Dreijer - singer, songwriter, record producer
 Olof Dreijer - DJ, record producer
 Nicolao Dumitru - football player
 Christer Gardell - venture capitalist
 Nicklas Grossmann - NHL hockey player
 Carola Häggkvist - singer, songwriter
 Sebastian Ingrosso - DJ/Producer of House
 Jessica Landstrom - football player
 Ulf Lundell - musician, songwriter, author
 Annie Lööf - politician, leader of the Centre Party
 Markoolio - recording artist, television show host, actor
 Nova Miller - recording artist, dancer, actor
 Mona Sahlin - politician, former leader of the Social Democratic Party
 Those Dancing Days - Indie pop band
 Cornelia Jakobs - Eurovision 2022 Participant, singer

International relations

Twin towns — sister cities
The municipality is twinned with:

 Keila, Estonia
 Pyhtää, Finland
 Jelgava, Latvia
 Gliwice, Poland
 Greenwich, Connecticut,  United States
 Santa Rosa del Peñón, Nicaragua
 Adalar, Turkey

Gallery 
The images give a view of how the geography looks, with some hills and some tall houses, and streets.

References

External links 

Nacka Municipality - Official site

 
Municipalities of Stockholm County
Metropolitan Stockholm
Stockholm urban area